The 2nd Cuirassier Regiment (French: 2e régiment de cuirassiers or 2e RC) was an armoured unit of the French Army, which originated as a cavalry and then a cuirassier regiment. It was descended from the régiment Cardinal-Duc, which is at the top of the list of twelve cavalry regiments created by the same royal ordnance of 16 May 1635 - this made the 2nd Cuirassier Regiment the oldest surviving cavalry regiment in the French Army, until its disbandment in 1991.

External links
2emecuirassiers.com
French Cuirassier Regiments and the Colonels who Led Them: 1792 to 1815 at http://www.napoleon-series.org/

Cuirassier regiments of France